Halictus lucudipennis is a species of bee in the genus Halictus, of the family Halictidae.

References
 http://www.discoverlife.org/mp/20q?search=Halictus+lucidipennis&flags=subgenus:

lucudipennis
Hymenoptera of Asia
Insects of Sri Lanka
Insects described in 1853